Amantes Sunt Amentes (Latin for Lovers Are Lunatics) is the fourth studio album by Mexican rock band Panda, released on 2 October 2006, through Warner Bros. and Movic Records. To promote the album, three singles were released. The first, "Narcicista Por Excelencia", including its music video, were premiered on Los 10+ Pedidos on MTV.

It was notably nominated for the Grammy Award for Best Latin Rock/Alternative Album in 2008.
It is the highest-selling album in their catalog to date, and was later certified gold and double platinum by AMPROFON for shipments of over 250,000 copies in Mexico. It also peaked at number one on the Mexican Albums Chart.

Track listing

Personnel 
Adapted from album liner notes:
Panda
 José Madero – vocals, guitar
 Ricardo Treviño – bass, guttural vocals
 Jorge Vázquez – drums
 Arturo Arredondo – lead guitar

Production
Adrián "Rojo" Treviño – producer, mixer
Francisco “Kiko” Lobo de la Garza – executive producer
Jaime Cavazos – mastering engineer at OVU Studios
Rodrigo Mendoza – recording assistant
Gerardo "El Oso" García – studio tech
Beto Ramos – drum tech
Mario Videgaray – art direction, design
Beto Garza – illustration

Additional musicians
Marcelo Treviño – keyboards
Alfonso Herrera – choirs

Charts

Certifications

Accolades
The album was nominated for the Grammy Award for Best Latin Rock, Urban or Alternative Album in 2008, but lost to Black Guayaba's No Hay Espacio.

References

2006 albums
Panda (band) albums